Buji Albati is a settlement in Kenya's Kilifi County.

References 

Populated places in Coast Province
Kilifi County